PGO may refer to:

Science and technology
 Phenylglyoxylic acid, a chemical
 Ponto-geniculo-occipital waves, found in the thalamus during REM sleep
 Profile-guided optimization, a computer compiler technique

Transport
 PGO (Automobile), a French car manufacturer
 PGO Scooters, a Taiwanese motor scooter brand of Motive Power Industry
 Stevens Field (IATA code), an airport in Archuleta County, Colorado, United States

Other uses
 Persian Gulf Online Organization, a non-governmental organization
 The Association of Professional Geoscientists of Ontario

See also
 Pogo (disambiguation)